Aleš Vála (born October 18, 1973) is a Czech former professional ice hockey defenceman.

Vála played seventeen games in the Czechoslovak First Ice Hockey League for HC Pardubice and thirty games in the Czech Extraliga for HC Bílí Tygři Liberec and BK Mladá Boleslav. He is currently working as equipment manager for Bílí Tygři Liberec.

References

External links

1973 births
Living people
HC Benátky nad Jizerou players
HC Bílí Tygři Liberec players
Czech ice hockey defencemen
HC Dynamo Pardubice players
BK Mladá Boleslav players
HC Slovan Ústečtí Lvi players
HC Tábor players
HC Vrchlabí players
Czechoslovak ice hockey defencemen